Evolutionary design, continuous design, evolutive design, or incremental design is directly related to any modular design application, in which components can be freely substituted to improve the design, modify performance, or change another feature at a later time.

Informatics 
In particular, it applies (with the name continuous design) to software development. In this field it is a practice of creating and modifying the design of a system as it is developed, rather than purporting to specify the system completely before development starts (as in the waterfall model). Continuous design was popularized by extreme programming. Continuous design also uses test driven development and refactoring.
Martin Fowler wrote a popular book called Refactoring, as well as a popular article entitled "Is Design Dead?", that talked about continuous/evolutionary design.  James Shore wrote an article in IEEE titled "Continuous Design".

Industrial design 
Modular design states that a product is made of subsystems that are joined together to create a full product. The above design model defined in electronics and evolved in industrial design into well consolidated industrial standards related to platform concept and its evolution.

See also
Rapid application development
Continuous integration
Evolutionary database design

References

External links
 Is Design Dead?

Software design